was a Japanese actor and voice actor from Tsuyama, Okayama. At the time of his death, he was affiliated with Theater Echo.

Yashiro was best known for his roles in Inakappe Taishō (as Nishihajime), Secret Squirrel (as Morocco Mole), the TBS version of Tom and Jerry (as Tom Cat), the 1973 Doraemon anime (as Suneo Honekawa), and Disney productions (as Winnie-the-Pooh). He also had many roles with Disney and Pixar.

History
Yashiro graduated from Meiji University's School of Political Science and Economics. Afterward, he became a member of the voice actor management company Theater Echo, performing in a number of radio dramas. Yashiro died of a stroke on June 25, 2003 at the age of 70.

Roles

Television animation
Demetan Croaker, The Boy Frog (Kyaru)
Dokaben (Ryō Inugami)
Doraemon (1973 series) (Suneo Honekawa)
Kaibutsu-kun (TV 2) (Bem)
Inakappe Taishō (Nishihajime)
Star of the Giants (Kawazoe)
Vicky the Viking (Golem)

Theatrical animation
Night on the Galactic Railroad
Metropolis (Notarlin)
Royal Space Force: The Wings of Honneamise (Speaker voice)

Tokusatsu
Kamen Rider (Amazonia (Ep 22), Kinokomorgue (Ep 24-25), Ghoster (Ep 41), Fly Man (Ep 42), Unicornos (Ep 51), Earthworm Man]] (Ep 59), Rebirth Harinezuras (Ep 66), Girizames (Ep 67), Gillerkourogi (Ep 69), Abugomens (Ep 71), Mosquiras (Ep 72), Sasoritokages (Ep 81), Sabotenbat (Ep 96))
Henshin Ninja Arashi (Kamakirigalan (Ep 9), Nomidokuro (Ep 16), Kawauso (Ep 20), Sphinx (Ep 26), Rebirth Franken (Ep 34), Backbeard (Ep 42), Ghostfather (Ep 44))
Kamen Rider V3 (Squid Fire (Ep 3-4), Pickel Shark (Ep 11-12), Burner Bat (Ep 15), Speargun Sealion (Ep 22), Propeller Rhinoceros beetle (Ep 23), Quoits Stag beetle (Ep 27-28), Camera Mosquito (Ep 29), Will-o'-the-Wisp Walrus (Ep 32), Thorned Starfish (Ep 48), Rebirth Will-o'-the-Wisp]] [[Walrus (Ep 51))
Kamen Rider V3 Movie (Cannon Buffalo Rebirth Pickel Shark)
Kamen Rider X (Cyclops (Ep 5), Mach Achilles (Ep 9-10), Alseides (Ep 17), Scorpion Geronimo (Ep 22-24), Chameleon Phantoma (Ep 29), Tiger Nero (Ep 34))
Five Riders Vs. Kingdark (Rebirth Mach Achilles, Rebirth Cyclops, Rebirth Alseides, Rebirth Hydra)
Kamen Rider Amazon (Crocodilia Beastman (Ep 8))
Kamen Rider Stronger (Kikkaijin Grongame (Ep 4), Mantis Kikkaijin (Ep 9), Kikkaijin Elekiika (Ep 13), Kikkaijin Arijigoku (Ep 20))
Kamen Rider (Skyrider) (Sasoranjin (Ep 4), Shibirayjin (Ep 18), Dokuganba (Ep 26), Hirubiran (Ep 27), Hikarabeeno (Ep 29), Okappa Priest (Ep 39-40), Zombieda (Ep 42), Abunger (Ep 45-47), Zenyoju (Ep 49))
Skyrider Movie (Jaguar Van)
Kamen Rider Super-1 (Elekibas (Ep 3), Ganigannii (Ep 9), JawsWani (Ep 11), Tsutadenma (Ep 20), GlasunKid (Ep 27), FrankeLighter (Ep 39), Goldar (Ep 43))
Kamen Rider Super-1 Movie (Rebirth Fire Kong, Rebirth Golden Jaguar,)
Pettonton (Jamolar (Eps 2-21, 23-28, 30-33, 35-37, 41, 46))
Choudenshi Bioman (1984, 31 episodes) - Messerjuu
Kyodai Ken Byclosser (Geronimo (Ep 2), Tankbombe (Ep 10), Focusman (Ep 20), Hyakumegun (Ep 26), Karasu (Ep ？), Fudebakon (Ep 31))
Gekisou Sentai Carranger (WW Waritcho (Ep 20))
Seijuu Sentai Gingaman (Geltgelt (Ep 26))

Video games
Kingdom Hearts (Winnie-the-Pooh)
Sonic Adventure (Big the Cat)

Dubbing roles

Live-action
The Empire Strikes Back (1980 Movie theater edition) (Captain Lennox)
Singin' in the Rain (Cosmo Brown)

Animation
The Jungle Book (Kaa)
Secret Squirrel (Morocco Mole)
Thunderbird 6 (TV edition) (Brains)
The Tigger Movie (Winnie-the-Pooh)
Tom and Jerry (original series) (Tom)
Snow White and the Seven Dwarfs (Huntsman)
Toy Story (Lenny)

Other
Pooh's Hunny Hunt (Winnie-the-Pooh)
Tokyo Disneyland Electrical Parade DreamLights (Winnie-the-Pooh)

References

External links
 

1933 births
2003 deaths
Japanese male voice actors
Male voice actors from Okayama Prefecture